The basic laws on copyright in Myanmar are Pyidaungsu Hluttaw Law No. 15/2019 (passed 14 May 2019 and effective 14 May 2020, sometimes known as the Copyright and Arbitration Act) and Pyidaungsu Hluttaw Law No. 3/2019 (passed January 30, 2019, sometimes known as simply the "Trademarks Law"). Burma has not signed the Berne Convention, but it has signed the TRIPS Agreement of the World Trade Organization. Burma is a member of the World Intellectual Property Organization (WIPO). Related and subsequent amending copyright legislation are listed by WIPO as well.

The main overseer for copyright is the Intellectual Property Department, and for registering trademarks the Office of Registration of Deeds. Prior to the 2019 law going into force, formal copyright registration procedures had never been instituted since the country's independence.

Prior to the 2019 law going into force, copyright in Myanmar was governed under the Copyright Act of 1911 (promulgated 1914 and sometimes known as the 1914 Act) and the Merchandise Marks Act 1889, both instituted when the country was part of the British Empire.

References

External links 

 Text of the Copyright and Arbitration Act (in Burmese)
 Text of the Trademarks Law (in Burmese)

Burma
Law of Myanmar